Stanislav Kropilák (10 June 1955 – 14 October 2022) was a Slovak basketball player. At a height of 6 ft 10 in (2.08 m), he was a power forward-center. He is considered to be one of the best European players of his generation. Kropilák was named one of FIBA's 50 Greatest Players in 1991. His nickname as a player was Kily.

Professional career
In his club career, Kropilák won five Czechoslovak Basketball League championships (1979, 1980, 1983, 1984, 1985). He was named to the Czechoslovak League All-Star Five ten times (1976–1985). He was also named to the FIBA European Selection four times (twice in 1981, 1982, 1987).

National team career
Kropilák competed for Czechoslovakia at the 1976 Summer Olympics and 1980 Summer Olympics. He helped to lead the senior Czechoslovak national team to a silver medal at the 1985 EuroBasket, and to bronze medals at the 1977 EuroBasket and the 1981 EuroBasket. He was also named to the 1983 EuroBasket's All-Tournament Team.

Personal life and death
Kropilák died on 14 October 2022, at the age of 67.

See also
Czechoslovak Basketball League career stats leaders

References

External links
 FIBA.com Profile
 Fibaeurope.com Profile
 
 
 

1955 births
2022 deaths
Basketball players at the 1976 Summer Olympics
Basketball players at the 1980 Summer Olympics
BBC Amicale Steinsel players
BK Inter Bratislava players
BK Pardubice players
Centers (basketball)
CEP Fleurus players
Czechoslovak men's basketball players
1978 FIBA World Championship players
1982 FIBA World Championship players
Olympic basketball players of Czechoslovakia
Power forwards (basketball)
Slovak men's basketball players
Spirou Charleroi players
People from Kremnica
Sportspeople from the Banská Bystrica Region
FIBA Hall of Fame inductees